Clivina eremicola is a species of ground beetle in the subfamily Scaritinae. It was described by Blackburn in 1894.

References

eremicola
Beetles described in 1894